Oliver Zeidler (born 24 July 1996) is a German rower and former swimmer. He is the reigning world champion in the men's single scull won at the 2019 World Rowing Championships and defended at the 2022 World Rowing Championships. He is the current World Games champion in indoor rowing in the open men's 2000 m class.

Family
Zeidler was born in 1996. He was born into a rowing family, with grandfather Hans-Johann Färber a double-Olympic medallist (gold in 1972 and bronze in 1976, both in the coxed four boat class). His grandfather trains his sister Marie (born 1999) who has won medals at 2016 and 2017 World Rowing Junior Championships. Oliver Zeidler is trained by his father, Heino Zeidler, himself a former junior world champion rower and a senior representative rower for Germany in the 1990s. The Zeidlers live in Erding. His aunt, Judith Zeidler, is an Olympic gold and bronze medallist in rowing and his aunt is married to double-Olympian Matthias Ungemach.

Swimming
Zeidler measures . He started swimming at age seven. At the 2015 German year championships in Berlin, he won gold in the 100 metres freestyle event for the year 1996 competition, silver for the same performance in the open category (years 1994 to 1996), and bronze in the 200 metres freestyle. He ended his competitive swimming career in February 2017.

Rowing
Curious about rowing, Zeidler first tried out a single scull in September 2016 at the Oberschleißheim Regatta Course where his sister trains. Less than a year later, Zeidler won the open men's 2000 m class in indoor rowing at the 2017 World Games in Wrocław, Poland. The previous month, Zeidler had come third at the German under-23 championships in single scull.

Zeidler's first international rowing regatta was the 2018 World Rowing Cup I in Belgrade. The heat was only his fourth race on a rowing course. In the A-final, he surprised by winning bronze in the open men's single scull, beaten by Czech incumbent world champion Ondřej Synek and the Swiss Roman Röösli. At the World Rowing Cup II race, the Czech and Swiss were not at the start and Zeidler again won bronze, this time beaten by the New Zealander Robbie Manson and the German champion Tim Ole Naske. At the World Rowing Cup III race, Zeidler won silver, again beaten by Manson. But more importantly, fellow German Naske came sixth in that race meaning that Zeidler was then selected as the German single sculling representative for the 2018 World Rowing Championships. He made the A-final at the 2018 World Championships but finished in overall sixth place.

2019 would be Zeidler's break-out year as a single-sculler. He took gold at the European Championships, won a gold medal at the World Cup II in Poznan and then placed 13th at the WRC III in Rotterdam. At the 2019 World Rowing Championships in Ottensheim he won all three of his preliminary races and then in the A final contested one of the closest and toughest world class sculling events witnessed. Zeidler led at the 500 m mark but saw his rival Sverri Nielsen and the Dutchman, Stef Broenink, have a lead over him at the next two marks where Zeidler sat fourth and then third. Zeidler stuck to his race plan and his long work through the water saw him come over the top of his rivals in the last few strokes, in a finish where the top five scullers were separated by only a 1-second spread.

References

External links

1996 births
Living people
German male rowers
German male swimmers
People from Dachau
Sportspeople from Upper Bavaria
World Rowing Championships medalists for Germany
Rowers at the 2020 Summer Olympics
Olympic rowers of Germany
20th-century German people
21st-century German people